The Alliance for the Republic–Yakaar is a political party in Senegal. It was formed by former Prime Minister and current president Macky Sall after his departure from the Senegalese Democratic Party (PDS) in December 2008. Macky Sall was also APR's candidate in the 2012 presidential election in which he defeated incumbent President Abdoulaye Wade. APR was joined by several former members of the PDS.

It is the dominant partner in the United in Hope coalition, which has held a majority in the National Assembly until 25 September 2022 when Aminata Touré announced she would no longer sit with the majority in the Assembly, accusing President Sall of promoting Amadou Mame Diop as president of the National Assembly due to "familial ties".

Electoral history

Presidential elections

National Assembly elections

See also 
 Abdou Mbow, spokesperson for the Alliance for the Republic (Senegal)

References

External links
Website of the Alliance for the Republic (French)
Alliance for the Republic - "Fans de Macky" (French)

2008 establishments in Senegal
Centrist parties in Africa
Liberal International
Liberal parties in Senegal
Political parties established in 2008
Political parties in Senegal